PayPak is a Pakistani domestic financial services and payment service launched by 1Link under the State Bank of Pakistan Vision 2020. Currently, 35 of the country's banks have adopted it. The reason to launch this domestic payment scheme was to save inter-change costs of International Payment Schemes. PayPak cards can only be used on ATMs & POS Terminals throughout Pakistan and enabled for online transactions.

The new payment scheme aims to compete in the domestic market with other international payment schemes like Visa, MasterCard & UnionPay.

Technology and license 
PayPak uses the Gemalto's product PURE. PURE is an off-the-shelf payment application from Gemalto that is fully compliant with the EMV™ standard. It is designed for dommes and private payment card associations looking for chip-based security and fast time to market. PURE is also a scheme-agnostic EMV application that private-label card issuers and national payment associations can use without the need to enter into a business agreement with another payment scheme.

Market share 
The uptake of the payment scheme has been slow. , more than 4 million PayPak cards have been issued – representing 3.5% of the 41.9 million payment cards issued in the country.

PayPak has 10% of market share in terms of volume of cards in the market.

While Visa has 40%, Mastercard and UnionPay have 25% each of market share.

See also
 Rupay
 Google Pay (payment method)
 Raast

References

External links
 PayPak Website

Payment systems
Pakistani brands
Banking in Pakistan
Credit card issuer associations
Debit card issuer associations
2016 establishments in Pakistan
Financial services companies established in 2016